The 2004 Dwars door Vlaanderen was the 59th edition of the Dwars door Vlaanderen cycle race and was held on 24 March 2004. The race started in Kortrijk and finished in Waregem. The race was won by Ludovic Capelle.

General classification

References

2004
2004 in road cycling
2004 in Belgian sport
March 2004 sports events in Europe